Herbert Edwin "Ted" Pool (9 November 1905 – 11 February 1975) was an Australian rules footballer who played with Hawthorn in the Victorian Football League (VFL).

Family
The son of William James Pool (1882-1934), and Harriet Jane Pool (1885-1962), née George, Herbert Edwin Pool was born at Boulder, Western Australia on 9 November 1905.

He married Thelma Marjorie Batten (1910-1989), one of twins, on 28 March 1934.

Football

Hawthorn (VFL)
Pool was a rover, and by playing 200 games of VFL football he became the first West Australian-born player to reach that milestone. 

Despite his ability, playing for Victoria seven times, Hawthorn were a very poor team during his career.

Pool is (as of 2014) one of only five players in the AFL/VFL to play 200 games or more without playing a final (the others are Steve Smith and Gary Hardeman of Melbourne and Geoff Cunningham and Trevor Barker of St. Kilda).

Camberwell (VFA)
Pool played 10 games at the age of 33 with the Camberwell Football club in 1939.

Death
Ted Pool died at Glen Iris on 11 February 1975 and is buried at Fawkner Memorial Park.

Honours and achievements
 Hawthorn leading goalkicker: 1933
 Hawthorn Hall of Fame
 Hawthorn life member

See also
 1927 Melbourne Carnival

Footnotes

References
 Holmesby, Russell & Main, Jim (2009), The Encyclopedia of AFL Footballers: every AFL/VFL player since 1897 (8th ed.), Seaford, Victoria: BAS Publishing.

External links

 
 
 Ted Poole (sic), at The VFA Project.

1905 births
1975 deaths
Australian rules footballers from Western Australia
Hawthorn Football Club players
Camberwell Football Club players
Kalgoorlie City Football Club players
Burials in Victoria (Australia)
People from Boulder, Western Australia